Panther Peak is a mountain located in Essex County, New York. 
The mountain is part of the Santanoni Mountains of the Adirondacks.
Panther Peak is flanked to the west by Couchsachraga Peak, and to the south by Santanoni Peak.

The northeast slopes of Panther Peak drain into Duck Hole pond, the source of the Cold River, which drains into the Raquette River, the Saint Lawrence River in Canada, and into the Gulf of Saint Lawrence.
The northwest slopes of Panther Peak drain into the Cold River.
The southwest slopes of Panther drain into Calahan Brook, thence into Moose Creek and the Cold River. 
The southeast slopes of Panther drain into Santanoni Brook, Henderson Lake, the source of the Hudson River, and into New York Bay.

Panther Peak is within the High Peaks Wilderness Area of New York's Adirondack Park.

See also 
 List of mountains in New York
 Northeast 111 4,000-footers 
 Adirondack High Peaks
 Adirondack Forty-Sixers

Notes

External links 
  Summitpost.org: Panther Peak
 

Mountains of Essex County, New York
Adirondack High Peaks
Mountains of New York (state)